Black Silence: the Lety Survivors Speak is a book by American author Paul Polansky, dealing with the testimony of the survivors of the Lety concentration camp in today's Czech Republic.

A series of testimonies in the survivors' own words are given in the book, and translations from the native Romany were given by a number of translators.

External links and sources
2010 reprint, via Lulu.com, featuring updates on Polansky's work and some of his and Tomás Ó Cárthiaghs poems.
Black Silence: The Lety Survivors Speak Cross-Cultural Communications (September 1998) 
, Massimo Paolini in  - , ISSN: 1133–6420, Nº. 105, 2019, p. 6-9

Memoirs of imprisonment
History books about World War II
1998 non-fiction books
Romani genocide
History books about genocide